Eryopidae were a group of medium to large amphibious temnospondyli, known from North America and Europe. They are defined as all eryopoids with interpterygoid vacuities (spaces in the interpterygoid bone) that are rounded at the front; and large external nares (Laurin and Steyer 2000).  Not all of the genera previously included in the Eryopidae (Carroll 1988) are retained under the cladistic revisions.

Gallery

References 
 Carroll, R. L. (1988), Vertebrate Paleontology and Evolution, W.H. Freeman & Co.
 Laurin. M and Steyer, J-S, (2000),  Phylogeny and Apomorphies of Temnospondyls - Tree of Life project

External links
Eryopoidea - Mikko's Phylogeny Archive

Permian temnospondyls
Eryopids
Pennsylvanian first appearances
Permian extinctions